Sylvia Grinnell Territorial Park (known as Iqaluit Kuunga in the Inuktitut language) is a Canadian territorial park on Baffin Island in the province of Nunavut.

Location and access
The park is located 1 km away from Iqaluit, the capital of Nunavut territory, to the west. From the centre of Iqaluit it is an easy 30-minute walk. There are cabs available in Iqaluit as well.

Area
The park covers 148 hectares.

History
In 1861, American explorer Charles Francis Hall became the first non-indigenous person to journey to the area, when he reached the place with Inuit help. He became the first non-indigenous person to realise that Frobisher Bay was a bay and not a North-West passage route to China as was believed. He went on to name many places in the area after his financial backers. The Sylvia Grinnell river was named after the daughter of his friend and benefactor Henry Grinnell. The river lends its name to the park. Iqaluit in Inuktitut means 'place of many fish' a reference to the Arctic char which thrives in the river. The Inuktitut for the park is Iqaluit Kuunga which means Iqaluit river. The park's landscape was formed by ice age glaciation 7100 years ago.

Sights
The Sylvia Grinnell river flows through the park. A viewing platform 55 metres above the falls offers an impressive view.

The park also has archaeological sites of the Dorset culture and the Thule people. Stone cairns and Thule ruins can be seen in the park.

Fauna and Flora
The caribou is the most important animal seen in the park. Arctic fox, Arctic hare and Polar bear are also seen in the park. The park is also home to around 40 avian species in the summer and spring seasons. They include Gyrfalcon, Common ringed plover, American golden plover, Horned lark, Rock ptarmigan, Snow bunting, Semipalmated sandpiper, Red-throated loon, Lapland longspur, Northern wheatear and Peregrine falcon. Commercial fishery for Arctic Char in the river was banned in 1965. Presently, a permit is required to fish in the river for non-Inuit. One of the most common plants in the park is purple mountain saxifrage, the official flower of Nunavut.

Tourism 
There are various hiking routes varying in difficulty and length with trail markers through the park. Sylvia Grinnell River is a popular spot for fishing but for tourists a license is nessary. Camping in the park is possible, and near the riverbank there are plateaus providing shelter for campers.

Gallery

References

External links

Ellesmere Island
Parks in Qikiqtaaluk Region
Territorial parks of Nunavut